Edward Osegueda better known as Edward'O (born in La Trinidad - Estelí, Nicaragua) is an American astrologer and former co-host of Telemundo's dating show, 12 Corazones.

Early life
Edward'O (born May 7, 1946 in Managua, Nicaragua) moved to Los Angeles, California in 1989. He graduated in Latin American studies and possesses a post-graduate in Spiritual psychology.

Edward'O studies various religions such as Buddhism and Hinduism, as well as the religions of Native Americans, among many others. He has dedicated more than 30 years to astrology and esotericism

Predictions
Some of Edward'O predictions include  
 Victory of President George W. Bush	
 Northridge earthquake in Los Angeles 	
 Loma Prieta earthquake in San Francisco 	
 Death of Adán Sánchez

See also
12 Corazones

References
Telemundo Website
Official 12 Corazones Website

American astrologers
20th-century astrologers
21st-century astrologers
Nicaraguan emigrants to the United States
People from Managua
Living people
Year of birth missing (living people)